Simeon Stubblefield (born 11 March 1959) is a Liberian boxer. He competed in the men's middleweight event at the 1988 Summer Olympics.

References

1959 births
Living people
Liberian male boxers
Olympic boxers of Liberia
Boxers at the 1988 Summer Olympics
Place of birth missing (living people)
Middleweight boxers